The El Salvador national football team 2011 season was the 90th season of the El Salvador national football team, their 73rd season in FIFA and 49th season in CONCACAF. The team was managed by José Luis Rugamas from January 2010. Rubén Israel took over as manager in April 2011.

January 2011 was spent playing in the Copa Centroamericana. El Salvador lost at the semi-finals and would unsuccessfully contest in the tournament for third-place. Their fourth place qualified them for the 2011 CONCACAF Gold Cup. Forward Rafael Burgos received the Golden Boot having made three goals. El Salvador's cache of success at season's end would be three international competitions; one was lost. Two others were to be played in 2011.

El Salvador took part in the 2011 CONCACAF Gold Cup Group A in June, and in September they started on their 2014 World Cup qualification. El Salvador starting at the Second Round.

Season overview

January
On 2 January, the issue of an official manager was under examination by Federación Salvadoreña de Fútbol (FESFUT) and had been discussed by them. Fernando Palomo stated in his ESPN blog that discussions had possibly taken place with a potential Spanish manager and FESFUT. The following day La Prensa Gráfica, a mainstream metropolitan newspaper in El Salvador, released the names of 3 possible Spanish managers to elsalvadorfc.com. As stated on elsalvadorfc.com, Juan Manuel Lillo, Benito Floro and Xabier Azkargorta were the names which FESFUT would consider as national coach. On 4 January Ramón Sánchez, captain of the El Salvador national team, was dismissed from training by the decision of coach José Luis Rugamas who named Marvin González as the new captain. Midfielder Arturo Alvarez, from Real Salt Lake, joined the players training group as one of the 21 players that have the opportunity to play in the 2011 Copa Centroamericana. Positive comments were made about his physical and tactical performance amongst the coaching staff.

According to Carlos Méndez Cabezas, FESFUT president and Comisión Ejecutiva de Selecciones Nacionales (CESEN) coordinator, Lillo would arrive in El Salvador on 10 January to view a better perspective of El Salvador's football. He would be accompanied by Iñigo Dominguez, his assistant, who contributed to Real Sociedad, UD Almería, and UD Almería's women's team. His visit was to meet FESFUT and negotiate his probable appointment as El Salvador national football team coach. Lillo declared, "The most important thing right now is that all of El Salvador is of support to his national team and his coach, José Luis Rugamas, to reach the goal is to qualify for the next Gold Cup. It is the most important thing right now." Lillo would be in Panama the following week to see the performance of the national team in the 2011 Copa Centroamericana. Carlos Méndez Cabezas had also declared that they were in negotiation with Lillo to coach La Selecta ("the selected") for the next World Cup qualifying campaign.

Central defence player Alexander Méndoza, from C.D. UES, lost the chance to represent his country in the 2011 Copa Centroamericana when he suffered a knee injury and could not recover in time. On 7 January Coach José Luis Rugamas announced the names of the 21 players for the official roster of El Salvador's national team to participate in the 2011 Copa Centroamericana, played in Panama from 14 to 23 January. From January 14 – 23 El Salvador participated in the 2011 Copa Centroamericana, the eleventh edition of the competition formerly known as UNCAF Nations Cup, a tournament for the CONCACAF-affiliated national teams of Central America. El Salvador qualified for the 2011 CONCACAF Gold Cup earning 2 wins, 1 draw (p.s.o.) and 2 losses from 5 matches, finishing in 4th place. Rafael Burgos was the top goalscorer of the tournament, with 3 goals, drawing with Marco Ureña of Costa Rica.

February

On 9 February, El Salvador were scheduled to play a FIFA international friendly against Haiti. The match team was coached by Rugamas after FESFUT had awarded him a 6-month renewal of his interim contract. The match was won by El Salvador with a goal in the 15th minute by Rafael Burgos, the season's top goalscorer.

FESFUT presented an economic budget to Lillo of US$300,000 per year (5 person deal). After days of speculation the Spanish coach turned down the offer of coaching La Azul y Blanco. The main reason of his rejection was that he could not commit to something without the right tools and infrastructure to do so, "within all this, there is dis-proportionality between what they intend and what you can give. You can not build a pool with a beach shovel."

As announced on 18 February El Salvador would continue its preparation for the 2011 CONCACAF Gold Cup with a friendly match against Syria on the 25th of March. There was still no definite coach, with interim coach José Luis Rugamas taking care of the friendly matches while he still had a valid contract with FESFUT.

March
On 3 March the tense situations in North African and Arab countries forced Syria to cancel the match with El Salvador. The Salvadoran football federation turned to the Primera División de Fútbol de El Salvador and the preliminary list of 23 players with who Rugamas, the interim coach, attempted to play the friendly games for 25 and 29 March – the second and third year's FIFA date. From the original 23 players only 18 could participate in the matches. The representative Promotora Figueroa ("Figueroa Promoter") has indicated that they are making arrangements to play against El Salvador, Iraq or Jordan on the agreed date. On 7 March C.D. Águila players did not present themselves for training. The five members of Águila: Osael Romero, Marvin González, Ramón Sánchez, Miguel Montes & Shawn Martin, did not receive permission from the board of directors of the team. Rugamas expected to work two microcycles, but the absence of players attached to the First Division left 16 and would affect training plans.

On 9 March it was announced that the international friendlies scheduled for March in Dubai were canceled; reasons for the cancellation could be due to tense situations in North African and Arab countries. Although new friendlies for March were confirmed: on March 24 in La Habana, against Cuba; and on March 27 in San Salvador, against Jamaica. These games would be fundamental in order to reach the CONCACAF top eight places. El Salvador rose six positions and was 92 in the FIFA rankings. It was in ninth place in CONCACAF, ahead of teams such as Grenada, Trinidad and Tobago and Haiti. El Salvador needed to be among the top 8 in the region to be seeded in the play-offs for the 2014 FIFA World Cup qualification. On 17 March, Steve Purdy was selected to play for El Salvador in the two friendlies against Jamaica and Cuba. However El Salvador did not give the Portland Timbers the 15 days notice required by FIFA and the Timbers chose not to release him.

On 21 March, José Luis Rugamas released the list of 18 players to face Cuba. Henry Hernández, Milton Molina, Edwin Sánchez, Gilberto Baires, Henry Escobar and Reynaldo Hernández were discarded, but were eligible for the next preliminary squad against Jamaica. The game was played on the 24 March. A long outside kick by substituted midfielder Dennis Alas gave La Selecta a victory over the Cuban side at the Estadio Pedro Marrero in Havana, Cuba. The game saw Brazilian-born Marcelo Messias' debut and the comeback of both Miguel Montes, after a 1-year suspension, and Ramón Sánchez. Luis Anaya, Ramón Sánchez and Dagoberto Portillo were injured by the constant contacts by the Cubans.

The game against Jamaica was rescheduled from the 27 to the 29 due to flight problems in Miami. El Salvador lost 2–3 against the Reggae Boyz (Jamaica) due to defensive errors. Deris Umanzor tried to raise up to the midfield but lost the ball and Dane Richards scored for Jamaica. Then a mistake by defender Messias meant Watson could pass to Richards scoring the second Jamaican goal. After the Jamaican 0–2 lead El Salvador began to produce problems for the caribbean side, mostly from Eliseo Quintanilla and Arturo Alvarez. In the 41st minute Jaime Alas scored to make El Salvadors first goal and the score at 1–2. El Salvador promised a good second half but Omar Cummings received a pass inside the El Salvador goal area and scored to make it 3–1 in Jamaica's favor. The clearest of El Salvador's opportunity was a penalty given against Osael Romero at 80 minutes which unfortunately crashed off the crossbar. In added time a shot from Edwin Sánchez was denied by Jamaican goalkeeper Kerr with Léster Blanco finishing off the goal, ending the match 3–2 at the final whistle.

On the last day of March the Federación Hondureña de Fútbol and the Federación Salvadoreña de Fútbol came to an agreement to settle an international friendly between the two countries. This match, scheduled for 29 May 2011 at the Robertson Stadium, will commemorate the debut of Honduras' new coach Luis Fernando Suárez. Alfredo Hawit, secretary of the FENAFUTH (Honduran football federation), said "we have reached a satisfactory agreement between the two federations, now everything is up to the coach to begin to prepare this blank to serve as a prelude to our participation in the Gold Cup.

April
On 6 April the new head coach, Rubén Israel, was presented in a press conference. "First of all thanks to the executive committee for welcoming me in this country and give me such a huge responsibility and so pretty, as is leading a national team", said the Uruguayan coach. The technical director explained that, "we have come here with our coaching staff to honor the work, beyond the mistakes and successes, the healthy intention is to work on Salvadoran football as a whole, working with major selections, but have a chronogram of action for youth teams, who are the future of the country." Also La Selección Salvadoreña, El Salvador national team in Spanish, will play against Argentina on 14 September 2011, although only players from the local league would participate. Israel left Uruguay for personal reasons on 14 April and returned on 25 April. The new physical coordinator of the national team would be Uruguayan Nicolás dos Santos, who has had experience in Real España (Honduras), the current 2010–11 Apertura champions.

During a press conference on 28, April Rubén Israel announced the coaching staff that will coach the pre-Olympic U-23 and national team. The individuals that will form the coaching staff are assistant managers Mauricio Alfaro and José Luis Rugamas, physical trainers Esteban Coppia (Argentina) and Nicolás Dos Santos (Uruguay) and the goalkeeping coach Carlos Cañadas.

May

On 2 May the coaching staff started training an 11-man preliminary squad that would eventually take part in the 2011 CONCACAF Gold Cup. Also, the head coach gave the players know their work system and objectives set out, "We will work to qualify for the 2014 World Cup. We know there are prior commitments such as the Gold Cup but we must never lose sight that our goal will be the playoffs", said Israel. They started off with a strong physical training. As intense that surprised even the players themselves. The idea was that they had spent several days without any activity thus would regain the rhythm as the members in the semifinals of the Clausura 2011, which will be added in coming weeks. One certainty was Israel's commands which were strong. And one fact was that he well knew the names of the players. He closed off by saying: "Good job, guys."

The trainings for that week would be of double shift, Monday through Friday (2 May — 6 May), and will not be a resting day to players on Wednesday as it was handled at first. The second day of work (3 May) showed great commitment and sacrifice in the part of the team. They endured with great confidence the new physical tasks of the physical coordinators.

After Isidro Metapán and Luis Ángel Firpo were eliminated from the semifinals of the Clausura 2011, Rubén Israel called-up some of these players to add up to the eleven players active in the training ground. From the new twelve players, Diego Chavarría and Ricardo Orellana did not participate in the semifinals of the Clausura 2011 but were chosen by the head coach for their performance in the El Salvador U–23. Also after two years and one month of absence goalkeeper Juan José "el Halcón" Gómez is called to the national team after his participation in World Cup 2010 South Africa qualification. Gómez was effusive in noting that both Miguel Montes as Dagoberto Portillo are by far the best goalkeepers in the country and is eager to work with them.

In a press conference on 10 May, Israel expressed his consideration that it would be necessary to face strong rivals. He said that he has asked for strong rivals in preparation for the qualifying stages for the 2014 FIFA World Cup. He also noted that Dustin Corea, a striker currently training in FESA, may incorporate for he received his Salvadoran passport.

The members of El Salvador did not train on Friday, May 13, 2011, morning, because they did not have a financial arrangement with the FESFUT for the period in which they attended to the training camps. This would be the last day of the second week of the trainings. The players issued a statement for which was signed by the group and released by Marvin González, central defender and captain. The document proposed that they would assist the concentration but would not train until there was an agreement. The preliminary squad asked to cancel salaries that they earned on their club and to not receive a bonus. The FESFUT also sent a statement in which Rafael Villacorta, a member, proposed a meeting for 16 May. Villacorta mentioned that they have not talked about the economical part because the rest of the members have been out of the country and because the financial structure of the federation does not allow them to.

Players
These players have been capped during the 2011 season (listed alphabetically):

 Dennis Alas
 Jaime Alas
 Arturo Alvarez
 Luis Anaya
 Gilberto Baires
 Christian Bautista
 Léster Blanco
 Rafael Burgos
 Rudis Corrales
 Cristian Esnal
 Alexander Escobar

 Andrés Flores
 Xavier García
 Juan José Gómez
 Marvin González
 Mardoqueo Henríquez
 Reynaldo Hernández
 Marcelo Messias
 Milton Molina
 Miguel Montes
 Carlos Monteagudo

 Dagoberto Portillo
 Steve Purdy
 Eliseo Quintanilla
 Osael Romero
 Edwin Sánchez
 Ramon Sanchez
 Herbert Sosa
 Víctor Turcios
 Deris Umanzor
 Rodolfo Zelaya

Debutants
 Gilberto Baires – on 16 January started in a Copa Centroamericana match against Belize
 Milton Molina – on 21 January started in a Copa Centroamericana match against Honduras
 Christian Bautista – on 9 February came on as a substitute in a friendly match against Haiti
 Marcelo Messias – on 24 March came on as a substitute in a friendly match against Cuba
 Steve Purdy – on 19 June started in a Gold Cup quarterfinal match against Panama
 Cristian Esnal – on 7 August started in a friendly math against Venezuela

Retirees
 Manuel Salazar – retired on 18 May to focus on academic and business ventures. Has a total of 51 caps and 0 goals

Player statistics

Goal scorers
{| class="wikitable" border="1"
|-
! Rank
! Player
! Goals
|-
| align=center|1
| Rodolfo Zelaya
| 7
|-
| rowspan="2" align=center|2
| Rafael Burgos
| 4
|-
| Jaime Alas
| 4
|-
| rowspan="2" align=center|4
| Osael Romero
| 3
|-
| Mark Léster Blanco
| 3
|-
| rowspan="3" align=center|6
| Christian Javier Bautista
| 2
|-
| Luis Anaya
| 2
|-
| Herbert Sosa
| 2
|-
| rowspan="9" align=center|9
| Deris Umanzor
| 1
|-
| Dennis Alas
| 1
|-
| Rudis Corrales
| 1
|-
| Arturo Alvarez
| 1
|-
| Eliseo Quintanilla
| 1
|-
| Edwin Sánchez
| 1
|-
| Xavier García
| 1
|-
| Víctor Turcios
| 1
|-
| Steve Purdy
| 1

Goal assists

Bookings

Competitions

Overall

Results summary

2011 Central American Cup

Friendly

2011 CONCACAF Gold Cup

World Cup Qualifiers

2014 FIFA World Cup qualification – CONCACAF Second Round

Group A

Coaching staff

Ranking

References

2011
El
2011–12 in Salvadoran football
2010–11 in Salvadoran football